Prahova Valley (Romanian: Valea Prahovei) is the valley where the Prahova river makes its way between the Bucegi and the Baiu Mountains, in the Carpathian Mountains, Romania.

World War I

During World War I, the area was the site of heavy fighting between Austro-Hungarian and German forces on one side and Romanian forces on the other. The strategic objective of the Central Powers was to reach Bucharest via the shortest route, but they were prevented from doing so by determined Romanian resistance.

Geography

Geographically, the Prahova river separates the Eastern Carpathians chain from the Southern Carpathians. Historically, the corridor was the most important passageway between the principalities of Wallachia and Transylvania. The DN1 road links Bucharest with the city of Brașov; the planned A3 freeway is currently being built along the Prahova Valley.

After failing to take part in the hosting of the 2013 European Youth festival, Prahova Valley considered making a bid for the 2022 Winter Olympics.

The region is a popular destination for mountaineers and for winter sports fans. The most important resorts are:

 Predeal
 Azuga
 Bușteni
 Sinaia
 Comarnic
 Breaza

See also
Tourism in Romania

References

External links
 Landscapes from the mountains above
Official Accommodation and Lodging Information On-Line Center 
Busteni Lodging and Accommodation

 
Valleys of Romania